Derbyshire County Cricket Club in 2008 was the cricket season when the English club Derbyshire had been playing for one hundred and thirty-seven years. In the County Championship, they finished sixth in the second division. In the Pro40 league, they finished eighth in the second division. They were eliminated at group level in the Friends Provident Trophy and in the Twenty20 Cup.

2008 season

Derbyshire was in Division 2 of the County Championship and finished in sixth position. In addition to the Championship, they played first class matches against Durham University and the touring Bangladesh A side. Of their eighteen first class games, they won four and lost four, the remainder being drawn. Derbyshire was in Division 2 of the NatWest Pro40 League in which they won one of their eight matches and tied another to finish eighth in the division. In the Friends Provident Trophy Derbyshire played in the Northern group, coming third in the table with three wins.  In the Twenty20 Cup, Derbyshire played in the North Division and won three matches to finish fifth in the division. Rikki Clarke was captain. Chris Rogers was top scorer with three centuries.  Graham Wagg took most wickets overall, closely followed by Charl Langeveldt who was ahead only in the Friends Provident Trophy.

Matches

First Class

NatWest Pro40 League

Friends Provident Trophy

Twenty20 Cup

Statistics

Competition batting averages

Competition bowling averages

Wicket Keeping
James Pipe 
County Championship Catches 21, Stumping 2  
PRO40 Catches 2, Stumping 1 
Friends Provident Catches 9, Stumping 0 
Twenty20 Catches 3, Stumping 2   
Tom New 
County Championship Catches 12 Stumping 2
Frederik Klokker 
County Championship Catches 10  
PRO40 Catches 4 Stumping 0

See also
Derbyshire County Cricket Club seasons
2008 English cricket season

References

2008 in English cricket
Derbyshire County Cricket Club seasons